Vojtěch Nejedlý (17 April 1772, in Žebrák – 7 December 1844, in Žebrák) was a Czech writer.

1773 births
1844 deaths
19th-century Czech Roman Catholic priests
Czech poets
Czech male poets
People from Beroun District